The Territory of Iowa was an organized incorporated territory of the United States that existed from July 4, 1838, until December 28, 1846, when the southeastern portion of the territory was admitted to the Union as the state of Iowa. The remainder of the territory would have no organized territorial government until the Minnesota Territory was organized on March 3, 1849.

History

Most of the area in the territory was originally part of the Louisiana Purchase and was a part of the Missouri Territory. When Missouri became a state in 1821, this area (along with the Dakotas) effectively became unorganized territory. The area was closed to white settlers until the 1830s, after the Black Hawk War ended. It was attached to the Michigan Territory on June 28, 1834. At an extra session of the Sixth Legislative Assembly of Michigan held in September, 1834, the Iowa District was divided into two counties by running a line due west from the lower end of Rock Island in the Mississippi River. The territory north of this line (which started just south of the present-day Davenport) was named Dubuque County, and all south of it was Des Moines County. When Michigan became a state in 1836 the area became the Iowa District of western Wisconsin Territory—the region west of the Mississippi River.

Burlington was the provisional capital; Iowa City was designated as the official territorial capital in 1841.  Fort Snelling was located on the western side of the Mississippi placing it within the Territory until statehood. 

When Iowa became a state on December 28, 1846, no provision was made for official organization of the remainder of the territory.  Morgan L. Martin, the Wisconsin territorial delegate to congress, pushed through a bill to organize a territory of Minnesota which would encompass this land.  While the bill passed in the house, it did not pass the senate.  In the following session a bill by Stephen A. Douglas was introduced in the senate but also did not pass.  The situation was resolved when Minnesota Territory was organized on March 3, 1849, the day before the close of congress.

In the 1840 United States census, 18 counties in the Iowa Territory reported the following population counts:

Governance
The executive powers of the Territory were vested in a Governor, a Secretary (who in case of the death, removal, resignation, or absence from the Territory of the Governor had gubernatorial powers and would perform gubernatorial duties), a Treasurer and an Auditor.

Territorial officers and Congressional delegates 
Territorial officers of Iowa Territory from 1838–1846.

Governors
 Robert Lucas, appointed 1838.
 John Chambers, appointed 1841.
 James Clarke, appointed 1845.

Secretaries
 William B. Conway, appointed 1838; died in office, November 1839.
 James Clarke, appointed 1839.
 O. H. W. Stull, appointed 1841.
 Samuel J. Burr, appointed 1843.
 Jesse Williams, appointed 1845.

Auditors
 Jesse Williams, appointed 1840.
 William L. Gilbert, appointed 1843.
 david ira bryan, appointed 1845.

Treasurers
 Thornton Bayless, appointed 1839.
 Morgan Reno, appointed 1840.

Congressional delegates
 William W. Chapman 25th and 26th Congresses, 1838–1840
 Francis Gehon, irregularly "elected" in 1839, but never served as delegate
 Augustus C. Dodge, in the 27th, 28th, and 29th Congresses, 1840–1846

Legislature 
Legislative powers were vested in a Territory of Iowa Legislative Assembly, which like that of Wisconsin Territory was divided into an upper house called the "Council" (although some legislative histories refer to the Council as the Senate) of 13 members, and a House of Representatives of 26.

See also 

 Historic regions of the United States
 History of Iowa
 Territorial evolution of the United States

References

 
Former organized territories of the United States
1863 establishments in Iowa
1846 disestablishments in the United States
Pre-statehood history of Iowa
Pre-statehood history of North Dakota
Pre-statehood history of South Dakota